The 1941 LFF Lyga was the 20th season of the LFF Lyga football competition in Lithuania.  It was abandoned.

League standings

References
RSSSF

LFF Lyga seasons
1941 in Lithuanian football
Lith